Pseudosorghum is a genus of Asian plants in the grass family.

 Species
 Pseudosorghum fasciculare (Roxb.) A.Camus - Yunnan, India, Bangladesh, Nepal, Bhutan, Myanmar, Philippines, Thailand, Vietnam
 Pseudosorghum zollingeri (Steud.) A.Camus - Myanmar, Philippines, Yunnan, Thailand, Vietnam, Java

 formerly included
see Saccharum 
 Pseudosorghum hildebrandtii - Saccharum hildebrandtii - Madagascar

References

External links
 The World Online Grass Flora - Grassbase: Pseudosorghum

Andropogoneae
Poaceae genera
Grasses of Asia
Taxa named by Aimée Antoinette Camus